The Miki House Group a.k.a.  is a Japanese corporation. Established in April 1971, with Koichi Kimura as the founder, and formally incorporated in September 1978, it has its headquarters in Osaka and a regional office in Tokyo.

 is a Japanese children's clothing and product company. Kunio Nishimura of Look Japan stated in 2001 that in Japan the company's name was "synonymous" with "top-drawer" merchandise.

 it has a magazine, Love, which it publishes once per month. Circa that year it began promoting "grandchildren's day", a holiday created by retail companies in an effort to drive more sales.

References

External links

 Miki House Global
 Miki House 

Japanese companies established in 1971
Clothing brands of Japan
Clothing companies of Japan
Clothing retailers of Japan
Children's clothing brands
Japanese brands
Retail companies established in 1971
Companies based in Osaka Prefecture